Mattias Morheden (born 26 September 1970) is a Swedish film and television editor. He has edited productions such as Wallander (2005), The Girl Who Played with Fire (2009) and The Girl Who Kicked the Hornets' Nest (2009).

Editor
2012: Apartment 1303 3D
2011: En gång i Phuket
2011: False Trail
2011: Hur många lingon finns det i världen?
2010: Hotell Gyllene Knorren
2010: Millennium (TV mini-series)
2010: Klara - Don't Be Afraid to Follow Your Dream
2010: Att bli med barn (short)
2009: The Girl Who Kicked the Hornets' Nest
2009: The Girl Who Played with Fire
2009: A Rational Solution
2009: Together
2008-2009: Habib (TV series)
2007: Labyrint (TV series)
2006: Hombres (TV series)
2006: Säg att du älskar mig
2006: Brothers: The Return
2006: Mentor (short)
2005: The Laser Man (TV mini-series)
2005: Wallander (TV series)
2005: The Return of the Dancing Master
2004: Skeppsholmen (TV series)
2003: At Point Blank
2003: Dirigenten (short)
2002: Disco Kung Fu (short)
2002: En kärleksaffär (TV short)

References

External links

1970 births
Swedish film editors
Living people